Eremica is a moth genus in the family Autostichidae.

Species
 Eremica saharae Walsingham, 1904
 Eremica molitor (Walsingham, 1905)

References

Symmocinae